How to Change Your Mind is a 2022 American docuseries based on the book of the same of the same name by Michael Pollan. It consists of four episodes, which were released on July 12, 2022, on Netflix and give insights into the psychedelic drugs LSD, psilocybin, MDMA and mescaline as well as their uses in psychedelic therapy. The series has been dubbed into Spanish, Hindi, Portuguese, French, Russian, German, Italian, Polish, Czech, and Hungarian.

Background
Michael Pollan published his book How to Change Your Mind in 2018. He serves as a presenter and guide throughout the miniseries.

On June 16, 2022, Netflix first published a trailer for the series and announced that Lucy Walker and Alison Ellwood would be directing, while Alex Gibney would serve as executive producer. Gibney expressed his pleasure working on the project, adding "It’s so important—a revelation about how some hallucinogens, once vilified, can lead to mindfulness. New science shows that these drugs can save lives and change our minds, helping us to live better lives."

According to director Alison Ellwood, the series tries to omit "psychedelic visual tropes—wild colors, rainbow streaks, morphing images" to make it relatable to people who have not had psychedelic experiences.

Episodes

Reception

Critical response
On Rotten Tomatoes, the miniseries holds an approval rating of 100% based on 9 reviews, with an average rating of 7.40/10. Stuart Heritage of The Guardian called the miniseries "hugely eloquent and convincing". Natalia Winkelman of The Boston Globe criticized the series for being too one-sided and failing to adequately address adverse effects of psychedelics. San Francisco Chronicle critic Bob Strauss found the series "not comprehensive, but packed with interesting tidbits" and says it provided "multiple worthy views that can be mind-blowing."

References

External links
 
 
 

Netflix original documentary television series
English-language Netflix original programming
2020s American television miniseries
2020s American documentary television series
Television shows about drugs
Documentaries about psychology
Documentary films about LSD
Psychedelic drug research